The 2018 Fótbolti.net Cup is the 8th season of Iceland's annual pre-season tournament. The tournament involves eight clubs from the top two leagues in Iceland, Úrvalsdeild karla and 1. deild karla, and uses a combination of group and knockout rounds to determine each team's final position in the competition. The tournament began on 12 January 2017 and will conclude at the beginning of February 2018.

Stjarnan were crowned champions after beating Grindavík in the final.

Groups

Group A

Matches

Group B

Matches

Knockout phase

Fifth place

Third place

Final

References

Fotbolti